Captain Alan Hugh Hillgarth  (1899–1978) was a British adventure novelist and member of the intelligence services, perhaps best known for his activities in Spain during and after the Spanish Civil War. Hillgarth appears as one of the actual historical figures in C. J. Sansom's 2006 novel, Winter in Madrid, and also in María Dueñas's 2009 novel, El tiempo entre costuras (English translation 2011, The Time in Between (US), The Seamstress (UK)).

Early years
Hillgarth was born George Hugh Jocelyn Hillgarth Evans (called "Hugh" by his family) at 121, Harley Street, Marylebone, London, second of three sons (there were also two daughters) of Willmott Henderson Hillgarth Evans, a leading London surgeon specialising in skin diseases, and his wife Ann Frances, daughter of Rev. George Piercy, a pioneer Methodist minister in China. Hugh changed his name to "Alan Hugh Hillgarth Evans" in 1926, and in 1928 discontinued use of the surname "Hillgarth Evans" in favour of "Hillgarth".

Career
In the book Roosevelt & Churchill: Men of Secrets, the historian David Stafford gives an account of Hillgarth's links with Winston Churchill in prewar Majorca, where Hillgarth was the British consul. By the outbreak of World War II, Hillgarth was Naval Attaché in Madrid, where he handled a huge number of clandestine intelligence operations on behalf of the British government. He had a prominent role in Operation Mincemeat in which faked documents were used to fool the Germans about Allied plans for the invasion of Sicily. He was successful at simultaneously appearing to try to retrieve the documents before the Germans saw them but making sure that they did, all without arousing suspicion. His work here led Ian Fleming to refer to Hillgarth as a 'war-winner'.

In his book Men of War, Hillgarth wrote that "adventure was once a noble appellation borne proudly by men such as Raleigh and Drake... [but is now] reserved for the better-dressed members of the criminal classes."

Hillgarth was also a member of the strange and extravagant 'Sacambaya Exploration Company,' which, in 1928, went in search of Bolivian gold. A number of British adventurers set forth on a romantic enterprise with modern machinery to excavate a treasure believed to amount to more than 12 million pounds. It turned out to be a scam, as the maps and documents turned out to have been fakes.

References

Further reading

1899 births
1978 deaths
British male novelists
20th-century British novelists
20th-century British male writers
Royal Navy officers of World War II
Companions of the Order of St Michael and St George
Officers of the Order of the British Empire
Royal Navy officers of World War I
Alumni of King's College, Cambridge